The Suffrage of Elvira is a comic novel by V. S. Naipaul set in colonial Trinidad.  It was written in 1957, and was published in London the following year. It is a satire of the democratic process and the consequences of political change, published a few years before Trinidad and Tobago achieved independence in 1962.

Plot summary
The novel describes the slapstick circumstances surrounding a local election in one of the districts of Trinidad.
Its main character is Surujpat Harbans. It also delves into the multiculturalism of Trinidad, showing the effects of the election on various ethnic groups, including Muslims, Hindus, and Europeans.

References

External links
Review of the novel in The New York Times.

Novels by V. S. Naipaul
1958 British novels
Novels set in Trinidad and Tobago
Novels about elections
André Deutsch books